This is a list of fellows of the Royal Society elected in 1901.

Fellows
James Mansergh  (1834–1905), civil engineer
Franz von Leydig  (1821–1908), German zoologist and comparative anatomist
William Watson  (1868–1919), British physicist
Sir William Schlich  (1840–1925), German-born forester 
Sir Henry Bradwardine Jackson  (1855–1929), Royal Navy officer, ship-to-ship wireless technology pioneer
Michael Rogers Oldfield Thomas  (1858–1929), zoologist
Sir Ronald Ross  (1857–1932), Nobel Prize–winning doctor for his work on malaria
John Walter Gregory  (1864–1932), geologist and explorer
Alfred William Alcock  (1859–1933), physician, naturalist and carcinologist
Hector Munro Macdonald  (1865–1935), Scottish mathematician
Arthur Smithells  (1860–1939), British chemist
Sir Frank Watson Dyson  (1868–1939), astronomer and Astronomer Royal
Sir Arthur John Evans  (1851–1941), archaeologist
Sir Arthur Smith Woodward  (1864–1944), palaeontologist
Sir William Cecil Dampier  (1867–1952), scientist, agriculturist, and science historian
Sir Charles James Martin  (1866–1955), biologist

References

1901
1901 in the United Kingdom
1901 in science